Space City Sigma is an Indian science fiction television series that aired on the DD National channel in the late 1980s. Along with Indradhanush, it was one of the first science fiction series produced in India. This series was edited by Ashok Talwar and directed by Ashok Talwar and Bizeth Bannerjee.

Space city sigma is the first ever made Indian science fiction show. This show was launched by DD National Channel on 21 May 1989.

Plot 
Sigma is a space city which is running on fusion energy and is docked on the Galactic frontier. It is the last stand for the humans against the technologically advanced race of aliens who are ruled by Zhakhakoo. The story starts when a strange and deadly creature boards the human galactic ship. It is shown that it is the latest tactic of Zhakhakoo to defeat Commander Tara and take control over the city. Commander Tara’s city is the last obstacle for Zhakhakoo and his plan to add earth to his astronomical kingdom and the universe. For his latest quest to conquer the city Zhakhakoo has sent a Blob for the mission.

Blob is a strange creature resembling a thump of cow-dung or smelly wet upla. The Blob jumps on unsuspecting target and sucks all the life force out of them. Blob has the ability to kill any person whom he touches. He starts killings innocent people of the space city. The people of the city are unable to find the reasons for the deaths. The word of the deaths, spread through the city like wild fire and causes mayhem and chaos throughout the city. Through this chaos, Blob is able to get close to Shakti who is the head of security of the city. Shakti falls into the trap created by Blob thus giving Blob and opportunity to attack Shakti. Blob uses his power of killing people and attach himself on Shakti’s face. Blob uses all his strength to make sure that Shakti is killed, and Shakti too looks like  on the verge of dying himself. There is a struggle between the two to defeat each other in the battle.

As the battle continues, it is shown that Blob in eager to kill Shakti forgets that he is a cyborg and Blob has attached himself to the metal side of his face by which it is impossible to kill Shakti. Before Blob realises his mistake Shakti overpowered Blob. Blob has no chance of standing against Shakti. Shakti uses all his strength and kills Blob and saves Sigma space city. The news of Blob’s failure reaches the ears of Zhakhakoo and he gets frustrated at the fact that he gets defeated again. The cast of this series are: Krishankant Sinha as Commander Tara the leader of Sigma Space City, Sanjeev Puri as Shakti who is a cyborg and the head of security, Kishore Dang as Varey who is the engineer, Savita Bhatia as Heeri who is the communication officer, Mita Vasisht as Teeba who is a scientist, Anand Sharma as Dr. Luka who is the doctor, Shailendra Srivastava as Zakhaaku the main antagonist of the serial, and Mukamba, Zakhaakoo’s assistant.

Characters
 Varey (Kishore Dang), the engineer
 Commander Tara (Krishan Kant), the leader of Sigma
 Shakti (Sanjeev Puri), the cyborg head of security
 Heeri (Savita Bhatia), the communication officer
 Teeba (Mita Vashisht), the scientist
 Dr. Luka (Anand Sharma), the doctor
 Zakhaaku (Shailendra Srivastava), the main antagonist
 Mukamba, Zakhaaku's assistant

See also
Captain Vyom
Aryamaan - Brahmaand Ka Yodha

References

External links
Space City Sigma on imdb.com

Indian science fiction television series
DD National original programming
1989 Indian television series debuts
1980s Indian television series